Four ships of the Royal Navy have borne the name HMS Princess Caroline or HMS Princess Carolina:

She was renamed HMS Princess Caroline in 1728, was rebuilt in 1731 and broken up in 1764.
  was a 44-gun fifth rate, previously the Dutch ship Princes Carolina.
  was a 50-gun fourth rate, previously a Dutch ship. She was renamed HMS Princess Caroline between 1799, reverting to HMS Rotterdam in 1806, before being sold that year.
  was a 74-gun third rate, also known as Princess Caroline.  She was previously the Danish ship Prindsesse Carolina, but was captured at the Battle of Copenhagen in 1807. There were plans to rename her HMS Braganza, but this was never carried out and she was sold in 1815.

See also
 
 

Royal Navy ship names